This is the complete list of Pan American Games medalists in table tennis from 1979 to 2019.

Events

Men's singles

Men's doubles

Men's team

Women's singles

Women's doubles

Women's team

Mixed doubles

References

Table tennis
Pan American Games